Uri Shraga Mayerfeld is a Rabbi and posek in Canada. He is the current Rosh Yeshiva (headmaster) of Yeshivas Ner Yisroel of Toronto in Toronto, Ontario.

Biography 
Rabbi Mayerfeld was born in Vineland, New Jersey. His father, Manfred Mayerfeld, was in the poultry business and was an active member of the Vineland Jewish community.

In his early years, Rabbi Mayerfeld studied in Philadelphia Yeshiva under the tutelage of Rabbi Shmuel Kamenetsky and Rabbi Elya Svei, and in Brisk yeshiva under the tutelage of Rabbi Berel Soloveitchik. He also studied under Rabbi Shneur Kotler and Rabbi Nosson Wachtfogel, and received smicha (rabbinic ordination) in 1971 from their yeshiva Beth Medrash Govoha of Lakewood, New Jersey.

When Rabbi Mayerfeld joined the Ner Yisroel faculty, he was a high school rebbi (religious studies teacher). He was promoted to Rosh Yeshiva after the death of the former Rosh Yeshiva, Rabbi Dov Gavriel Ginsburg.

Currently, Rabbi Mayerfeld is an active leader of the Toronto Jewish community. He leads a daf yomi (Talmud) class for the general public and frequently speaks at public Jewish events.

References 

Living people
People from Vineland, New Jersey
Rosh yeshivas
Canadian Orthodox rabbis
20th-century Canadian rabbis
21st-century Canadian rabbis
Year of birth missing (living people)
Rabbis from Toronto